This article lists the various overseas military bases of France. The maintenance of overseas military bases enable the French Armed Forces to conduct expeditionary warfare, and often tend to be located in areas of strategic or diplomatic importance.

In the French terminology, the "prepositioned forces" consist of the "sovereignty forces" based in the Overseas France and the "forces of presence" based abroad.

Sovereignty forces

Forces of presence

Other

See also
Power projection
List of countries with overseas military bases

References

External links
Forces prépositionnées (defense.gouv.fr)